Mildlife are a Melbourne based, Australian psychedelic jazz fusion group formed in 2013. The group have released two albums. Their second peaked at number 8 on the ARIA Charts in October 2020.

Discography

Albums

Live albums

Extended plays

Singles

Awards and nominations

AIR Awards
The Australian Independent Record Awards (known colloquially as the AIR Awards) is an annual awards night to recognise, promote and celebrate the success of Australia's Independent Music sector.

! 
|-
| 2021
| Automatic
| Best Independent Jazz Album or EP
| 
| 
|}

ARIA Music Awards
The ARIA Music Awards is an annual ceremony presented by Australian Recording Industry Association (ARIA), which recognise excellence, innovation, and achievement across all genres of the music of Australia. They commenced in 1987.

! 
|-
| 2021|| Automatic || Best Jazz Album || 
| 
|-
| 2022
| Live from South Channel Island
| Best Jazz Album
| 
|

Music Victoria Awards
The Music Victoria Awards, are an annual awards night celebrating Victorian music. The commenced in 2005.

! 
|-
|rowspan="3"| 2018
| Mildlife
| Breakthrough Act of 2018
| 
|rowspan="3"|
|-
| Phase
| Best Soul, Funk, R'n'B and Gospel Album
| 
|-
| Mildlife
| Best Electronic Act
| 
|-
| 2019
| Mildlife
| Best Electronic Act
| 
| 
|-
| 2020
| "Rare Air"
| Best Victorian Song
| 
| 
|-
|rowspan="2"| 2021
| Mildlife
| Best Group
| 
|rowspan="2"|
|-
| Mildlife
| Best Live Act
| 
|-

References

2016 establishments in Australia
ARIA Award winners
Australian indie rock groups
Heavenly Recordings artists
Musical groups established in 2016